Criminal Brigade (Spanish:Brigada criminal) is a 1950 Spanish crime film directed by Ignacio F. Iquino and starring José Suarez, Soledad Lence and Alfonso Estela. It is a film noir with large amounts of location shooting in Madrid.

Plot 
Fernando Olmos, a recently graduated police officer, witnesses a bank robbery, although he cannot do anything to prevent it. His first job is to infiltrate a garage as a car washer to catch a thief, unaware that the owner of the establishment is also the head of the robbery gang.

The film ends with a shocking sequence: the fight against the robbers in a building under construction: the Francisco Franco Health Residence, now the Valle de Hebrón Hospital in Barcelona.

Cast
 José Suarez as Fernando Olmos Sánchez
 Soledad Lence as Celia Albéniz 
 Alfonso Estela as Óscar Román 
 Manuel Gas as Inspector Basilio Lérida 
 Barta Barri as Mario 
 Pedro Córdoba de Córdoba
 Fernando Vallejo
 Antonio S. Amaya as Eduardo 
 José Manuel Pinillos 
 Tomy Castels
 Carlos Ronda as Correo 
 Matías Ferret  
 José Soler
 Maruchi Fresno
 Isabel de Castro
 Carlos Otero  
 Mercedes Mozart

References

Bibliography
 Bentley, Bernard. A Companion to Spanish Cinema. Boydell & Brewer 2008.

External links 

1950 films
Spanish crime films
1950 crime films
1950s Spanish-language films
Films directed by Ignacio F. Iquino
Films set in Madrid
Films produced by Ignacio F. Iquino
Spanish black-and-white films
Films scored by Augusto Algueró
1950s Spanish films